Ubuntu Rugby is a rugby team based in Lisbon, Portugal. As of the 2012/13 season, they play in the Second Division of the Campeonato Nacional de Rugby (National Championship). The club is the official rugby team of the Academia Ubuntu.

History
The club was founded in as Clube de Rugby Kellerman, named after its founder South African Philip Kellerman.

Portuguese rugby union teams